Chester Township may refer to:

Arkansas
 Chester Township, Arkansas County, Arkansas, in Arkansas County, Arkansas
 Chester Township, Crawford County, Arkansas, in Crawford County, Arkansas
 Chester Township, Dallas County, Arkansas, in Dallas County, Arkansas

Illinois
 Chester Township, Logan County, Illinois

Indiana
 Chester Township, Wabash County, Indiana
 Chester Township, Wells County, Indiana

Iowa
 Chester Township, Howard County, Iowa
 Chester Township, Poweshiek County, Iowa

Michigan
 Chester Township, Eaton County, Michigan
 Chester Township, Otsego County, Michigan
 Chester Township, Ottawa County, Michigan

Minnesota
 Chester Township, Polk County, Minnesota
 Chester Township, Wabasha County, Minnesota

Nebraska
 Chester Township, Saunders County, Nebraska

New Jersey
 Chester Township, New Jersey

North Dakota
 Chester Township, Grand Forks County, North Dakota, in Grand Forks County, North Dakota

Ohio
 Chester Township, Clinton County, Ohio
 Chester Township, Geauga County, Ohio
 Chester Township, Meigs County, Ohio
 Chester Township, Morrow County, Ohio
 Chester Township, Wayne County, Ohio

Pennsylvania
 Chester Township, Delaware County, Pennsylvania

South Dakota
 Chester Township, Douglas County, South Dakota, in Douglas County, South Dakota
 Chester Township, Lake County, South Dakota, in Lake County, South Dakota

Township name disambiguation pages